The Chilean order of precedence is currently prescribed by the Public Ceremonial and Protocol Regulation. This regulation establishes the order of precedence of national official activities as well as common regulations to activities organized by provinces and regions. The general order established by the decree is modified if the event takes place elsewhere in Chile instead of in Santiago Metropolitan Region.

Order of precedence in the Metropolitan Region 
 The President of the Republic (Gabriel Boric)
 The President of the Senate (Álvaro Elizalde)
 The President of the Supreme Court (Juan Eduardo Fuentes Belmar)
 The President of the Chamber of Deputies (Raúl Soto)
 The former presidents of Chile
 Eduardo Frei Ruiz-Tagle
 Ricardo Lagos Escobar
 Michelle Bachelet Jeria
 The Archbishop of Santiago (Celestino Aós Braco)
 The President of the  Episcopal Conference (Santiago Silva Retamales)
 The Cardinals of the Catholic Church
 Francisco Javier Errázuriz Ossa
 Ricardo Ezzati Andrello
 A high representative of the Evangelical Churches (Alfred Cooper Rickards)
 The President of the Constitutional Court of Chile (Juan José Romero Guzmán)
 The Comptroller General of the Republic (Jorge Bermúdez Soto)
 The National Prosecutor of the Public Ministry (Jorge Abbott Charme)
 The President of the Central Bank (Mario Marcel Cullell)
 The President of the Election Qualifying Court (Rosa Egnem Saldías)
 The President of the Directive Council of the Electoral Service (Andrés Tagle Domínguez)
 The Minister of the Interior and Public Security (Rodrigo Delgado Mocarquer)
 The Minister of Foreign Affairs (Andrés Allamand Zavala)
 The Minister of National Defense (Baldo Prokurica Prokurica)
 The Minister of Finance (Rodrigo Cerda Norambuena)
 The Minister General Secretariat of the Presidency (Juan José Ossa Santa Cruz)
 The Minister General Secretariat of Government (Jaime Bellolio Avaria)
 The Minister of Economy, Development and Tourism (Lucas Palacios Covarrubias)
 The Minister of Social Development and Family (Karla Rubilar Barahona)
 The Minister of Education (Raul Figueroa Salas)
 The Minister of Justice and Human Rights (Hernán Larraín Fernández)
 The Minister of Work and Social Security (Patricio Melero Abaroa)
 The Minister of Public Works (Alfredo Moreno Charme)
 The Minister of Health (Enrique Paris Mancilla)
 The Minister of Housing and Urbanism (Felipe Ward Edwards)
 The Minister of Agriculture (María Emilia Undurraga Marimon)
 The Minister of Mining (Juan Carlos Jobet Eluchans)
 The Minister of Transport and Telecommunications (Gloria Hutt Hesse)
 The Minister of National Goods (Julio Isamit Díaz)
 The Minister of Energy (currently held by the Minister of Mining)
 The Minister of Environment (Carolina Schmidt Zaldívar)
 The Minister of Sport (Cecilia Pérez Jara)
 The Minister of Women and Gender Equality (Mónica Zalaquett Said)
 The Minister of Cultures, Arts and Heritage (Consuelo Valdés Chadwick)
 The Minister of Science, Technology, Knowledge and Innovation (Andrés Couve Correa)
 The Dean of the Diplomatic Corps (Apostolic Nuncio Alberto Ortega Martín)
 Foreign ambassadors (by order of precedence)
 The Commander-in-chief of the Chilean Army (Ricardo Martínez Menanteau)
 The Commander-in-chief of the Chilean Navy (Juan Andrés de la Maza Larraín)
 The Commander-in-chief of the Chilean Air Force (Arturo Merino Núñez)
 The General Director of Carabineros de Chile (Ricardo Yáñez Reveco)
 The Director General of the Investigations Police of Chile (Sergio Muñoz Yáñez)
 The Chief of the Joint Chiefs of Defence (Javier Iturriaga del Campo)
 The Vice President of the Senate (Jorge Pizarro Soto)
 The Vice Presidents of the Chamber of Deputies
 The First Vice President (Francisco Undurraga Gazitúa)
 The Second Vice President (Rodrigo González Torres)
 The Senators (by alphabetical order)
 The Members and the Prosecutor of the Supreme Court
 The Members of the Constitutional Court

References

Orders of precedence